One Man and His Droid is a game published by Mastertronic in 1985 for use on the Amstrad CPC, Atari 8-bit  family, Commodore 16, Commodore 64, and ZX Spectrum home computer systems. The name of the game is a play on the title of the BBC television show One Man and His Dog. The object of the game is to use a doglike droid to collect Ramboids, the male form of alien sheep. The player must move these Ramboids into teleporters to win the game.

Gameplay 

Before the game begins, the player is given the option of inputting a password in order to resume a game they were playing earlier, otherwise starting at the beginning. There are passwords for each of the twenty different ramboid-filled caverns, and as the player progresses through each cavern, the computer releases the corresponding password.

At the start of a game, the screen is split up into several different windows. Largest and centrally placed is the main window that looks into a cavern, displaying a view of the droid placed centrally amongst the scenery. The first task is to guide the droid to the start position.

Ramboids are dim. They move very predictably, and always reverse their direction of movement if their way is blocked. They are also delicate creatures that only live for about twenty minutes. The player is working against the clock all the time. Should the player fail to get at least four Ramboids in the teleport in the right order within the time, play is returned to the first screen.

Music 
The music for the Commodore 64 version was composed by Rob Hubbard. Commodore 64 enthusiasts and former owners frequently list Hubbard's composition as being one of the finest to feature in any game released for that machine. Hubbard himself states that he took inspiration from Jean-Michel Jarres' album Magnetic Fields for this song. 

The Atari 8-bit and Amstrad versions had a different theme, which was shorter.

Reception
Zzap!64'''s reviewers thought that, although the game had basic graphics, it was enjoyable to play, with the bonus of a good soundtrack. It was given an overall rating of 81%.

 Legacy
A follow-up, One Man and his Droid II'', was written for the ZX Spectrum in 1991 but wasn't commercially published. It was eventually released on the internet in 2001 by its programmer, Clive Brooker.

References

External links
Crash magazine review
Clive Brooker's website for One Man and His Droid II

One Man and His Droid at Plus/4 World.

1985 video games
Commodore 16 and Plus/4 games
Commodore 64 games
ZX Spectrum games
Mastertronic games
Amstrad CPC games
Atari 8-bit family games
Video games scored by Rob Hubbard
Video games developed in the United Kingdom
Single-player video games
Action video games
Puzzle video games
Video games about robots